Dennis Scott Harriger (born July 21, 1969) is an American former professional baseball pitcher.

Harriger attended Ford City High School in Ford City, Pennsylvania where he played for the school's baseball team. Between his junior and senior years, he had a .400 batting average and struck out 275 batters. He led the school to a Pennsylvania Interscholastic Athletic Association state championship in 1987, recording the win in both the semifinal and final game. He played on that team alongside Gus Frerotte. He was later named to the Ford City Hall of Fame.

Although Harriger did not have any college baseball scholarship offers from NCAA Division I programs, he was selected by the New York Mets in the 18th round of the 1987 Major League Baseball draft. He made his professional debut on June 30, 1987 in a relief pitching appearance for the Kingsport Mets. Harriger spent six seasons pitching the Mets farm system before being granted free agency in October 1993.

References

External links

1969 births
Living people
Baseball players from Pennsylvania
Detroit Tigers players
Major League Baseball pitchers
Nashua Pride players
Lancaster Barnstormers players
Acereros de Monclova players
American expatriate baseball players in Mexico
Binghamton Mets players
Chinatrust Whales players
American expatriate baseball players in Taiwan
Columbia Mets players
Indianapolis Indians players
Kingsport Mets players
Las Vegas Stars (baseball) players
LG Twins players
American expatriate baseball players in South Korea
Long Island Ducks players
Pittsfield Mets players
St. Lucie Mets players
Toledo Mud Hens players